Celebrity branding or celebrity endorsement is a form of advertising campaign or marketing strategy which uses a celebrity's fame or social status to promote a product, brand or service, or to raise awareness about an issue. Marketers use celebrity endorsers in hopes that the positive image of the celebrity endorser will be passed on to the product's or brand's image. Non-profit organizations also use celebrities since a celebrity's frequent mass media coverage reaches a wider audience, thus making celebrities an effective ingredient in fundraising.

History 

In the 1700s, Wedgwood, producers of fine chinaware, used royal endorsements as a marketing device to show value in the company and promote their product. In 1882, London socialite and West End stage actress Lillie Langtry became the poster-girl for Pears Soap, making her the first celebrity to endorse a commercial product. In the late 1800s, trading cards were introduced, a card with an image of a celebrity and a product description which was either given to the customer or inserted in product packaging. Cigarette companies gave away baseball cards as part of a customer loyalty scheme, and the increased demand to buy cigarettes in order to collect entire sets of baseball players was not missed by marketers. Early endorsements of this kind didn't always have the permission of the celebrities to use their image. In the 1930s the trend was toward athletes where the first celebrity and athlete to be paid to endorse a brand was “Babe Ruth. This occurred in the 1930s and the brand was Red Rock Cola which is a beverage company.” and then by 1945, the trend changed to movie stars. In 1965 when color television was introduced, television personalities and entertainers became the celebrity endorsers. In the 1980s, companies started making products around celebrities, for example Nike using Michael Jordan to boost their brand to international megabrand status.

In the 1970s, with the advent of free agency, the value of celebrity endorsements escalated, and correspondingly the pay of the athletes by their teams. By 1989, 75% of all sports-related products were using athletes for endorsements, and by the 1990s sports endorsements were being announced with press releases. This led to celebrities becoming spokespeople and brand ambassadors for companies. Product revenues increased dramatically, as did the value of the endorsement contracts. For example, Tiger Woods' first contract with Nike was worth $40 million; it was renegotiated in 2000 for a 5-year contract valued at $125 million.

Celebrity reach 
Celebrity branding or celebrity endorsement of a company's product is effective largely because celebrities have the potential to reach a large number of prospective consumers. Reach can be loosely defined as the number of people that have seen and/or heard the brand's intended message at least once. If a company is considering using celebrity branding to market their product, they probably are wanting to reach the largest number of potential consumers, rather than reach a small number of consumers more frequently. A celebrity's reach can be demonstrated in measurements such as the number of followers of a celebrity's social media accounts such as Facebook, Instagram, Twitter, and Snapchat. An A-list celebrity can potentially reach millions of consumers with a single post. For example, in 2017, Selena Gomez had 130 million Instagram followers, Cristiano Ronaldo had 116 million, and Ariana Grande had 115 million.

Brand image 
There is a high focus placed upon the importance of choosing a reliable, trustworthy celebrity to endorse or sponsor a company's product, while still balancing the celebrity's attractiveness, power, and similarity of the celebrity's public image with the company's overall current, or intended brand image.

Brand image can be described as "the set of beliefs held about a particular brand". Research carried out by Keller & Aaker in 1992 suggests that a brand with better positive brand image and attitudes is more likely to achieve heightened development within their relevant market. Therefore, choosing a celebrity who is going to beneficially contribute to the existing or intended image and attitudes of the brand is vital to ensure the success of the celebrity branding.

Brand alliance 
The brand alliance is a business strategy that can involve the intentional process of associating two or more established brand names in a specific attempt to attract attention from consumers and thus increase the chances of earning additional sales for all the businesses involved.

Brand recognition 
Brand recognition is a huge part of celebrity branding. Brand recognition is where the general public is able to establish a brand from its attributes.  It is most successful when a brand is exposed without a company name and is then recognized by the customer through the visual signifiers such as logos, slogans, and colors. An example of this is Coke whereby their signature color is red and consumers acknowledge that. Brand recognition is extremely effective in promotional campaigns. To measure brand recognition and the effectiveness it has on promotional campaigns, companies will conduct experiments on study groups for results. If brands are equal in quality similar products brand recognition will always have an advantage of higher sales.

This quote explains that there are two types of celebrity endorsement: explicit and implicit.

An example of explicit endorsement can be seen through Beyoncé's sponsorship deal with PepsiCo. In 2012, Beyoncé and PepsiCo sat down and penned a partnership deal that is estimated to be worth approx. $50 million, that embraces the standard Pepsi print and TV commercials that Beyoncé will appear in, as well as a more unorthodox 'creative fund' for any future projects Beyoncé chooses to take on. This is an effective explicit endorsement because not only does Beyoncé have incredible reach, being one of the world's biggest female popstars, but also the term 'partnership' feels more genuine for consumers which may make them more likely to believe that Beyoncé is endorsing the Pepsi product because she believes in the product and the company behind it, rather than some celebrity endorsements which feel forced, or where consumers see through the endorsement and assume it is just a business decision on behalf of the celebrity to make some extra cash.

An example of implicit endorsement can be explained by noticing the growing number of Beats by Dre portable speakers that have been appearing in pop and hip-hop music videos, (such music videos include Lady Gaga, Miley Cyrus, Nicki Minaj and Britney Spears). The celebrities involved are not expressly mentioning the Beats product within their music videos, but their presence amongst these celebrities convey the message of it being a high-quality product associated with those of a high social class, particularly those who are industry leaders in music.

Advantages 
Celebrity endorsements can build brand equity. An example of this is Nike. Prior to Michael Jordan, Nike mostly sponsored tennis and track athletes and decided to expand their market, which increased sales to become a multibillion-dollar company. Celebrity endorsement is used as an advertising strategy, by using celebrity status and image, to promote a brand's recognition, recall, and differentiation.

A celebrity endorser who likes and utilizes the product, and has some knowledge about it, is presumed to be more passionate about the product and would therefore promote the product in a believable way that consumers would find more persuasive.

The most effective advertisements are those that are supported by celebrity endorsements.

Celebrities in advertising make the advertisement more noticeable to some consumers, and are therefore a good basis of capturing and retaining consumer attention. Studies have shown that using celebrities in advertising increases the message's persuasiveness which results in consumers having a better recall and recognition for the product or brand. 

Some celebrities are held at a higher regard than others, thus, an endorsement of a product/brand can potentially build trust in the consumer for the brand. Celebrities are perceived to hold qualities such as attractiveness, expertise, trustworthiness and likeability, which advertisers hope will be transferred to the brand or product consequently creating positive images for that product or brand. Many consumers idolize celebrities and strive to imitate their lives with the clothes they wear and products they consume.

Disadvantages 
Due to the high-profile lives of celebrities that are constantly being reviewed and scrutinized by the media, there are risks of using celebrities in advertising.

The term eclipsing (also referred to as overshadowing) is used to describe the instance where a celebrity in an advertisement overshadows the product being advertised by occupying more time or space than the product being advertised, this is a negative for the advertiser as the product is not the main focus for the consumers. It is crucial for the effectiveness of the advertisement to ensure that the product is the focus of attention.

Overexposure refers to the negative effect that is a result of when a celebrity endorses multiple products of a similar type at one time. Consumers can become more skeptical of the celebrity's motives to endorse products and therefore may perceive the celebrity to be less credible when endorsing multiple products.

Celebrity endorsements do not guarantee long-term favorable effects, due to the risk to advertisers that the celebrity endorser may get caught up in a scandal, creating negative perceptions to consumers. Common celebrity scandals involve alcohol, drug, sex, or crime related events. These scandals can have a negative effect on the image of the brand, as consumers' negative perceptions of the celebrity endorser may be transferred to the brand, therefore negatively influencing sales of the brand's products. One of the largest profile celebrity endorsement scandals of recent history was the infidelity scandal of Tiger Woods in 2009, at the time, Woods was a brand ambassador for Nike Golf apparel and footwear. It has been estimated that Nike lost approximately US$5–12 billion due to this scandal. News about celebrity scandals or other controversies can alter the message a company is trying to convey about its brands. A consumer's personal views on the celebrity could directly affect that same consumer's image of the company. 

Consumers' views of the celebrity endorser may change due to changes in the celebrity's image. Changes in image may be a result of injury, physical appearance, change in marital status, or a decline in professional visibility and this can result in the celebrity endorser no longer suiting the product or brand being endorsed.

Risks 
When a celebrity is promoting a brand there can be risks involved, where there is a miscommunication between the consumer and the representation of the product. In some cases, there is no connection between the product and the celebrity, which can become an effective or a defective result due to the position and relevance of the product. When celebrity branding does not work out for a firm, the celebrity can be seen as a scheme to promote the person as a marketing instrument. Ideally, some consumers believe that companies who use celebrity endorsers, as a marketing strategy to promote a product should choose an endorser who utilizes and enjoys using the product. Therefore, ethically they are trusting the brand and showing potential consumers the effects of the product and making the advertisement more believable. Rather than a celebrity endorser who is promoting the brand just because of their social status and there is no relevance between the product and the celebrity.

Companies who use celebrity endorsers are at a risk financially, whether they are choosing the right celebrity endorser to represent their brand and return the favor with an increase in sales, or for the brand to become known on a wider scale. Firms are also taking risks in hoping that their chosen celebrity endorser will portray their brand in the correct way, because any small or big mistake can cost the company in a negative outcome, especially due to the celebrity's social status it can affect a huge audience. This could be due to miscommunication between the firm and the endorser advertising the product or service.

Risk for companies 

The entire aim of marketing and advertising is to draw attention to one's business and persuade or manipulate the target market into consuming goods or services. The more attention brought to the company, the larger opportunities are gained to communicate with consumers. Using celebrity branding, there is an advantage because the particular endorser already has a large audience and following, thus attention can be drawn easily. It is how the business uses this attention decides whether the outcome is beneficial or negative to the brand because there are dear impacts if an error is made due to the many people watching and making judgments. The theory of market senses/sensory marketing is where a marketer relates to an audience on an emotional level. By taking advantage of the already built attention, the right celebrity branding whether the brand is looking for a celebrity with sex appeal or a reputation of charity or generosity, these can develop an emotional response and connection from consumers which can benefit the business greatly. Though if celebrities possess undesired traits, this can generate a negative emotional response which would turn consumers away from a brand.

With the future being so unexpected, using a celebrity to endorse a product and business could bring huge positives or could have immensely damaging effects but there is no way of predicting which outcome the business will get. By choosing the perceived most trustworthy and suitable celebrity relative to the business is usually the safest bet to gain success and prevent reputation damage.

Effectiveness 
A source (defined as the individual or group that intends to communicate an idea, or message to their target audience, also known as a sender,) will be more effective in their objective to convince consumers to purchase a product if the receivers perceive them as attractive, credible, and powerful. The attractiveness of the sender is determined by how much the audience likes the person that is making the statements about the company/product. The credibility can refer to how much we trust the individual's opinions/morals, and how convincing their belief in the product that they are sponsoring is. An individual is considered powerful when they can "affect behavior because of perceived reward or punishment".

One of the clearest examples of the importance of a celebrity's credibility when endorsing a product can be seen with Tiger Woods' endorsement of Nike in 2000. The involvement of Tiger Woods within Nike "resulted in the acquisition of approximately 4.5 million customers and $60 million in profit".) However, following the 2009 scandal, (Tiger was caught sleeping with around 7 women while married to his wife,)) Nike began to see shifts in their sales. According to a study conducted by Carnegie Mellon University's Tepper School of Business, "the scandal cost Nike $1.7 million in sales and lost the company nearly 105,000 customers." This just goes to show that although Tiger Woods was still attractive to consumers, and still a very powerful man, he was no longer credible and as a result his endorsement in the later years did more harm than good.

Usage 

Celebrity branding is used to help create a further image as a brand. The use of celebrities helps to humanize the brand. This creates a brand identity as consumers begin to relate the celebrities' characteristics with the brands.  There are different ways celebrity branding can be used in paid and unpaid endorsement methods.

Celebrity branding can take several different forms, from the appearance of a celebrity in advertisements for a product, service or charity, to a celebrity attending PR events, creating their own line of products or services, or using their name as a brand. The most popular forms of celebrity brand lines are for clothing and fragrances. Some singers, models and film stars have at least one licensed product or service which bears their name. The use of a celebrity or of a sports professional can have a huge impact on a brand. For example, sales of Nike golf apparel and footwear doubled after Tiger Woods was signed up on a sponsorship deal.

Celebrities also provide voice-overs for advertising. Some celebrities have distinct voices which are recognisable even when faces are not visible on a screen. This is a more subtle way to add celebrity branding to a product or service. An example of such an advertising campaign is, Sean Connery's voice-over for Level 3 Communications.

However, in some cases the celebrity did not give permission to be associated with the brand and was wrongly attributed to the brand. For example, on 23 July 2008, Taco Bell launched their "Why Pay More?" campaign and used 50 Cent's name and trademark as a way to endorse their low-cost menus. 50 Cent was unaware of this endorsement and therefore sought out legal action. He filed a lawsuit against Taco Bell and sued for $4 million. He won the case.

Paid endorsement 

Paid endorsement or overt endorsement involves a contract between the brand and the celebrity to represent the brand in an advertising campaign. The contract may involve some restraints on the celebrity's act; such as cutting their hair or endorsing a direct competitor.
Paid endorsements involves a contract between the brand and the celebrity to represent the brand. The celebrity will generally gain a sum of money for endorsing the brand but also have a few guidelines to follow. Some methods of paid endorsements are: 

 Advertisements

Advertisements can include television advertisements, radio, billboards, or magazine posters showing the celebrity in the brands advertisement to help increase the products image. The celebrity could be seen using the product, or the main character, as being seen in the advertisement can help viewers associate them with the brand. An example of Celebrity Branding in an advertisement is George Clooney in Nespresso's' 'What else' advertising campaign. Celebrities used for voice-overs or radio advertisements generally have a distinct voice that viewers will recognize, like  Morgan Freeman's voice.

 PR Events
Brands use events for the celebrity to be seen at, as it helps show their support or association with the brand. Having photos taken of the celebrities at the event makes the viewers associate them with them supporting the brand, making the viewer associate a positive connection. This can be done through celebrities hosting the brands event, like Victoria's Secret Show, using celebrities to perform on the catwalk.  

 Social Media
Celebrities promote brands using social media, like Instagram, Facebook or Snapchat. This helps the brand target the celebrities' followers to create an association between the two.

Social media sites, including Twitter, Instagram and Facebook, are a popular non-traditional medium for celebrities endorsing products and brands. The advantages of using celebrity endorsements on social media is the large reach that celebrities have. This means that large audiences are exposed to the influence of the celebrity to encourage positive purchasing behavior towards the brand. In 2013, the most followed accounts on Twitter with more than 30 million followers each were Justin Bieber, Lady Gaga and Katy Perry. The more followers someone has the greater perceived social influence they hold. As well as having reach to their followers, any post may be shared by their followers to extend that reach to further audiences. Another benefit of using social media for celebrity endorsements is the interactive nature of this non-traditional media, which helps to build the relationship between the celebrity endorser, consumer and the brand.

In 2009, growing concern about consumers being misled by celebrity endorsers on social media platforms led to the Federal Trade Commission introducing a set of guidelines to protect consumers called "Guides Concerning the Use of Endorsements and Testimonials in Advertising". As a result, celebrity endorsers are required to advise consumers when they have been paid to endorse a product, this can be done through the use of hashtags #ad, #spon, #paid.

 Instagram

The hiring of a spokesman or celebrity has increased as a digital marketing technique. Celebrities have been endorsing products and services of businesses on television and print media for decades. However, the social networking site Instagram is now often used as a platform for businesses to market products or services either through a third parties page, such as a celebrate, or directly through their own Instagram page. Having started as a social networking site, Instagram has evolved into a successful marketing tool. What is special about Instagram is the fact that it encourages electronic word of mouth, which exist solely on the concept of sharing. Companies can simply tag the username for the businesses Instagram page to allow other potential consumers to browse through that Instagram account in just one click.

The culture of advertising on Instagram came naturally when businesses realized that celebrities have a direct means of communication to their target demographic. According to the Telegraph (2015), the ten most popular Instagram accounts are all celebrities who all have around 30 million followers. By partnering with one of these celebrities, businesses are already reaching an engaged and targeted audience of 30 million people. Many of America's top-earning celebrities Instagram accounts are continually promoting products such as health supplements, vitamins and detox teas. These aren't spontaneous proclamations, but rather posts paid for by brands to advertise products to the celebrities' sizeable following.

On Instagram alone a profile with three-to-seven million followers can charge as much as $75,000 per endorsement, even a profile with 50,000 to 500,000 followers might make $1000 for a post on Instagram. At the top end of the digital celebrity pay scale some posts can earn around $300,000, especially when Instagram pictures can be easily linked to other social media platforms such as Facebook or Twitter.

Kim Kardashian, for instance, is well known for promoting brands on her Instagram page and currently posts advertisements for at least eight different brands, ranging from jewelry to morning sickness medication. Her estimated earning of $51 million is from posting on her social media channels alone. Similarly, footballer Cristiano Ronaldo endorses TAG Heuer through his Instagram account where he dutifully thanks them for the watches he has been given as a 'gift' and signs off his posts on Instagram with the companies advertising slogan.

Puma SE have recently increased their digital marketing campaigns through the use of sponsored adverts and endorsements on Instagram. This now allows products to be bought directly from the social media platform. As well as facilitating interactions with the companies target audience, promoting products through Instagram can also generate media coverage. For example, Puma have aligned with Kylie Jenner to create the Puma Fierce trainer; reactions on social media to this collaboration from the likes of Kanye West have increased the awareness of the product.

Celebrity advertisement posts on Instagram can generate upwards of 10 million engagements, according to social media data provider D’marie Archive. This makes these forms digital marketing communication an attractive bet for advertisers seeking millennial eyes. Furthermore, the principle analyst at eMarketer Debra Williamson states that these celebrities influence teens and young adults when it comes to making a purchase, firms can reach out to people through Instagram that otherwise would not be reached. This is because visual images tend to be more engaging than text alone. Instagram has become an interactive channel that brands can use to communicate with their customers on a more personal level.

Unpaid endorsement 
Unpaid endorsement or covert endorsement occurs when a celebrity wears or uses the product of a certain brand because they like it. Brands can send free samples to celebrities to try out their product, and review or use on social media to give their opinion on the product. Many beauty companies use this to get YouTube reviewers to review their product so they get free advertising. Sometimes a celebrity is given merchandise by a brand to use or wear in public where there is maximum exposure, such as an event. This is called "gifting" and the celebrity might endorse the brand by taking a photo of the gift and putting it on their social media account for their fans and followers to see. Whilst the "gifting" may appear to be unpaid, costs are associated with this endorsement, as the brand does not have any contract in place with the celebrity and will have little or no protection against what happens during the unpaid endorsement.

Celebrities are seen wearing or using the product due to liking it themselves. They could be seen wearing the product in public or in photos on social media. This is 'free advertising' for the brand. A disadvantage of this is the brand has no control over what message or image the celebrity associated with the brand is portraying.

Celebrity endorser criteria 
When companies are selecting a celebrity to endorse their brand, they must match a certain criteria that they wish for the brand to be associated with. The celebrity must fill the gap between the consumer and brand when one is present. 
 Audience: The celebrity must be able to connect and reach the audience the brand is most compatible with.
 Characteristics: Must fit the brand's characteristics so that they associate the right values with the brand. 
 Image: Brands must look and see if the celebrity's image is one the brand wants to be associated with, making sure they look into the celebrity's image and past in case it could put the company into a bad light. If the celebrity has a negative image, the brand could be perceived that way too.  
 Attractiveness: A positive attitude is associated with attractive people. The more attractive a celebrity is, the more effective the endorsement will be. They look at the physical attributes the celebrity has such as body shape, facial features, and nationality. 
 Cost: Some celebrities can cost more than others due to popularity. The amount the celebrity costs to have endorsed a product or service can influence whether they are selected or not.
 Credibility: The credibility of the celebrity will transfer onto the brand so they must ensure the celebrity has a credible reputation. If a celebrity is already endorsing other brands or has endorsed a lot of brands in the past, this can have a negative effect on the brand image as consumers could believe that they are only doing it for the money and their credibility could come into question on whether the product is actually as good as what they are saying, creating the brand's credibility to come into question also.

Advantages vs. disadvantages for brands

Advantages 

 Instant brand awareness: People will begin associating the celebrity with the brand, meaning the brand is more recognizable, building stronger brand awareness.
 Personality Transfer: Using celebrity branding can create a personality transfer where the brand inherits the personality of the celebrity. This can be an advantage if the celebrity has a positive reputation as the brand gains the attributes of the celebrity.
 Define and refresh brand image: The celebrity's attributes help to create the brand's attributes, and can also refresh a brand's image so that people know exactly what the brand stands for. Some brands also use it to re-brand their image, as before it might not have had a strong brand image that saw it in a positive light.
 New consumers: When a celebrity endorses a brand, they often bring their followers along too, creating new consumers for the brand as they can reach a new market. The celebrity appeals to their consumers, which then can become the brand's consumers, as they want to try what their celebrity is endorsing.
 Influences consumer purchases: New consumers arise as they follow the celebrity. This creates the outlook that if the celebrity thinks the product is great, then they should try it too. They desire to be like the celebrity, which influences the sale.
 Brand Positioning: A celebrity can help position the brand or product in the minds of the target market, forming a positive connection. This can increase the brand position over other brands.
 Lasting Publicity: Even after the endorsement deal is over, consumers will still associate the brand with the celebrity. Brands will gain that connection with the consumers without needing the celebrity as a current endorser.

Disadvantages 

 Image change: Since the brand is being associated with a celebrity, everything they do will be associated with the brand. A bad celebrity image change changes the brand's image and can cause a drop in popularity, losing consumers and credibility of the brand.  An example of this was Maria Sharapova being dropped by three of her major sponsors such as Nike, after failing a drug test at the 2016 Australian Open. Celebrities can make mistakes and the brand can choose to back their endorser or drop them to avoid their reputation being tarnished too.
 Loss of popularity: If a celebrity loses followers by becoming less popular, which could be done through negative actions, the brand will also lose popularity with that market. The loyalty of the consumers to the brand will only stay if they are loyal to the celebrity.
 Overexposure: Celebrities' credibility can suffer if they endorse too many brands or products, especially in similar fields. This makes consumers associate the celebrity with many brands, rather than a single brand, making their association with the brand less strong and compelling.
 Overshadowing: By a celebrity endorsing the product, consumers can just be interested in the celebrity rather than following the brand. This means that they don't actually create a connection with the brand, as their attention is focused on the celebrity, overshadowing the initial product or brand.

Advantages vs. disadvantages for celebrities  
Celebrity endorsement also affects the celebrity. The brand itself can have a positive and negative influence on the celebrities' image showing a reverse effect of the celebrity endorsing the brand.

Advantages 

 Positive image: If the celebrity becomes an endorser for a company with a positive image, the celebrity can gain the same reputation of the brand they are associated with. This could be if they join with a brand who is environmentally friendly, the celebrity can be seen to be environmentally friendly also.
 Income: Brands will pay a huge amount for celebrities to endorse their product or service. This means celebrities gain more income for associating themselves with the brand.
 Fame: Celebrities can also gain a bigger following from the brand’s consumers. They think that if the celebrity likes a brand they do, that they should like the celebrity too.

Disadvantages 

 Lose credibility: If the brand does something deemed unacceptable by consumers, the celebrity can also be seen in this light. This could cause followers of the celebrity to be doubtful of them, not just the brand. Assumptions could be made that the celebrity agrees with all actions of the brand and become less credible by association.
 Put off other endorsements: By celebrities endorsing one brand, they could put off other brands offering them endorsement deals meaning they could miss out on more money or getting a deal with a brand they like more. They could also be seen as disliking other competitor brands or not able to associate themselves with other brands such as Nike and Adidas, as they are in the same market.

Importance 
Celebrity branding has become a marketing strategy to help appeal a brand to new consumers. They are a way for brands to increase their sales and grow their market, having a huge influence on society as they are seen as opinion leaders. Brands build a relationship with new consumers through celebrities endorsing their products. Celebrities can capture the consumer's attention and identify with the brand, leading to sales and making the brand more desirable over other competitors. They also have an influence over their followers due to consumers showing an increase in obsession with celebrities.  A connection can be made with the consumers in a way brands cannot. Some generations look up to celebrities as they can aspire to be like them. Many brands will ride the celebrity's success wave when using them in an endorsement.

Effectiveness 
It is important for a brand to choose their celebrity endorser carefully after considering factors, such as who fits the brand's image and what kind of message the brand wants to get across to the audience. It is also important for the celebrity endorser to be attractive, credible, and trustworthy as the image of the celebrity enhances advertising effectiveness.

A report by Brand Affinity Technologies (BAT), a celebrity marketing company, discusses the effectiveness of celebrity endorsement in social media advertising. In 2011, BAT analysed 200 social media endorsements against comparable social media advertisements that did not feature any celebrities and found that endorsed messages gave performance rates huge lifts: the results showed that 50% improvement was made in cost-per-action for endorsed messages over non-endorsed advertising, and the click-through-rates for endorsed messages were 17~21 times higher.

Match-up hypothesis 
The match-up hypothesis generally suggests that the image of the product or the brand that is being endorsed by the celebrity should match the image of the celebrity to make an effective advertisement. The match-up hypothesis is only relevant when the product or the brand that is being advertised is related to a product that enhances one's attractiveness. Thus, it is not only important that the images of the product and the celebrity matches, but the importance of the need for the two images to match on an attractive basis is emphasized.

Consumers decipher the cultural codes embodied in celebrity images and actively identify personal, social and cultural meaning in these idols. Therefore, this is why celebrity branding and endorsing through technology has become increasingly more of a trend with initial touch points of communicational advertising. More and more corporate brands are enlisting celebrities to differentiate their brand and create a more competitive advantage through media. For example, if there are two brands that have a similar or identical product, it is almost guaranteed that the brand with the more established and well-known celebrity will be more successful in sales and interest.  Big companies such as Adidas and Nike use high-profile celebrities to appeal to the emotional side of the average consumer. Celebrities provide much more than entertainment. They influence consumers' perceptions, behaviors, values and decisions.

Celebrity entrepreneurial branding 
Celebrity entrepreneurial branding refers to when a celebrity associates themselves as a financial stakeholder and/or decision maker of a product line. There are three types of involvement that a celebrity can have with the branding of a product line, these are mono-branding, co-branded celebrity products and noncelebrity-branded products. Clothing and fragrances are the most common types of product lines.

Mono-branding 
Mono-branding refers to when a product carries only the name of the celebrity and the manufacturer does not directly associate itself with the product. Mono-branding is commonly used to expand the customer base, or to extend the brands. An example of this, is the collaboration between manufacturer Elizabeth Arden and Britney Spears who created the Britney Spears fragrance line.

Co-branded celebrity products 
Co-branded celebrity products refers to a strategic alliance between two brands, to develop, produce and market a product, whilst all parties retain their name. state there are three levels of co-branding: reach/awareness co-branding, value endorsement co-branding and value awareness co-branding. Reach/awareness co-branding is the lowest level and its purpose is to maximize brand awareness. On the second level is value endorsement co-branding which aims to align either both or one of the brand's values in the consumers mind. Finally, ingredient co-branding. This level of co-brandings aims to create higher value creation by using the product of a market leading brand "as a component of another brand". Co-branded celebrity products is commonly used in order to create greater value, expand customer base and increase brand awareness for both brands involved. An example of a co-branded celebrity product is the collaboration between Taylor Swift and Keds footwear who in 2012 released a range of shoes called the Taylor Swift for Keds Collection.

Noncelebrity-branded products 
Noncelebrity-branded products are products that are not branded with the manufacturer or the celebrity's name. This method of celebrity branding is commonly used when the endorsing celebrity has a 'narrow audience', is of limited appeal to the wider market, or the celebrity-product relationship is not a perfect fit. The product or brand may have better success or broader appeal if it is not directly associated with the celebrity entrepreneurial endorser. This is largely common in the food industry, with many celebrities opening restaurants for example Arnold Schwarzenegger opened Schatzi, an Austrian restaurant. An example of this in an alternative industry is the clothing line 6126, which was founded by Lindsay Lohan.

Famous musicians collaborating with designer brands 
Society at large has embraced the fashion choices of numerous musicians, and collaboration of famous musicians and designer brands is not exclusive to the 21st century. For instance, Nirvana's lead-man, Kurt Cobain, represented 1990s grunge fashion while rapper Tupac Shakur was a symbol for 1990s hip hop fashion. When hip hop music sales increased throughout the 1980s and 1990s, many apparel manufacturers wanted to capitalize on the trend. Karl Kani, a clothing brand centered around urban hip hop culture, attributed most of its success to the likes of Tupac and Mos Def wearing its apparel. Music and fashion continue to intersect today due to the trend of celebrity musicians collaborating with designer brands. According to the Journal of Marketing Management, celebrity endorsement can be effective because consumers believe in the celebrity figures and consequently support the brands that the endorser markets. Evaluation of celebrity branding also suggests that credible advertising messages, coupled with the right endorser, can build consumer loyalty for the brand.

Companies today often work with famous musicians to reap various benefits for their business such as increasing brand awareness. Singer and songwriter, Lana Del Rey, collaborated with H&M, and a study found that the posts containing Del Rey on the Facebook brand page received more likes than their regular posts, averaging out to around 667,000 likes per post. Over the past couple of years, many other well-known musicians have started their own capsule collections with designer brands.

FENTY PUMA by Rihanna 
In December 2014, Grammy award-winning artist, Rihanna became a brand ambassador and creative director of the fashion sportswear brand PUMA. In this role, Rihanna oversaw the brand's women's line which included collaborations in apparel, footwear, and accessories. In 2015, Rihanna released her first footwear collaboration with PUMA, the Creeper, which sold out within three hours of its pre-sale launch. Following the success, Rihanna and PUMA teamed up to create her very first fashion line named after her last name: FENTY PUMA by Rihanna. Each of the collection's seasons has introduced a different concept visually. The first season that dropped had roots in goth-streetwear culture, the 2017 spring/summer collection was French-inspired and described by Rihanna as, "If Marie Antoinette was going to the gym and needed something to wear." Furthermore, the 2018 autumn/winter drop features a collection influenced by different cliques of high school. The apparel pieces features elements like exaggerated block letters and preppy silhouettes all designed by the help of the singer herself. In an interview with Vogue, Rihanna said, "I have never gotten the chance to dress up in school. I always had to wear a school uniform...making this collection, I was able to have a little fun and play and create."

Rihanna's last collection with PUMA dropped on 15 March 2018 fusing race culture and beach wear. According to Rihanna, making this collection "was definitely a challenge" but she "really wanted to make something that was completely different" than anything she's ever done before with PUMA. The introduction of Rihanna's line has not only been praised by critics and fashion bloggers, but has brought the company great success. Since the collaboration with the musician, PUMA has seen a 183% increase in searches on their site and Rihanna's velvet Creepers won Shoe of the Year Award in 2016.

GUESS x A$AP Rocky 
In 2016, GUESS collaborated with rapper, A$AP Rocky, on a capsule collection featuring a line of apparel and accessories for both men and women. Since A$AP Rocky is a prominent rapper who has also been known for his style and interest in the fashion industry, the Los Angeles native brand, GUESS, paired up with him to release a 1990s hip-hop throwback collection with a modern spin. Referring to the initial concept of the collaboration, Rocky said, "It was just all about doing this whole throwback thing and bringing back Guess and just showing its importance in hip hop. Let's be real, Guess was the s**t for hip hop." The line of apparel features iconic GUESS pieces like the triangle logo, colourful stripes, and distressed denim jackets with a redesigned version of the GUESS logo on the back. Most of the pieces in the collection replace the original "s" in "GUESS" with embroidered dollar signs in order to represent the rapper's insignia. According to Rocky, the line was also meant to feel nostalgic, "I just wanted to bring back that feeling for our generation. There's so much that they don't know about, even with access to the Internet. I have a platform, so I'm just trying to show kids what they missed out on. They don't know about the '80s and early '90s."

During the summer of 2017, the rapper and GUESS hosted pop up shops in New York City and West Hollywood where celebrities and fans attended to get the first chance to purchase something from the collection. Despite the buzz from his collaboration with GUESS, the company still reported a loss of $21.3 million in its fiscal first quarter as of May 2017.

Fred Perry x Amy Winehouse Foundation 
Fred Perry is a British clothing brand founded in 1952 by triple Wimbledon champion, Fred Perry. The brand is known for its expensive yet casual wear, cashmere polos, sport-inspired wear, and involvement in mod culture. In 2010, the brand collaborated with the late British singer, Amy Winehouse to release a 1950s and 1960s inspired collection all designed by Winehouse herself. Richard Martin, former marketing director for Fred Perry, said the brand chose to collaborate with Winehouse because they "were aware she was a genuine fan of the brand" and because "Amy has a unique sense of style that reflects the brand's own historical reference points." For the collection Winehouse was inspired by her own retro wardrobe and said, "I still dress like I am in the 50s." The line varies in its product assortment, featuring plaid shirts and rompers, vintage sweaters, and polos with embroidery replicating the singer's own tattoo designs. The singer was only alive during the first drop of her collaboration which featured pieces like an argyle longline sweater that she was often seen wearing in the public, as well as during her recording session with Tony Bennett. After Amy Winehouse died on 23 July 2011, Fred Perry eventually received permission from her family to continue to release the rest of the collection over the next couple of years. Mitch Winehouse, the singer's father said, "When Fred Perry came to us to ask what we would like to do with the new collection, it was natural to continue. Amy loved working on both collections and would want them to be made available."

The singer's collection with Fred Perry is still available for sale online, but some of the new pieces are not based on original designs by Winehouse. Instead, her tattoo artist, Henry Hate and the Fred Perry design team have collaborated to continue working on the collection. Since the new collaboration, all sales from the collection's Fall 2011 and Spring 2012 pieces were donated to the Amy Winehouse Foundation. The Amy Winehouse Foundation was started by the singer's parents after she died, and mainly aims to prevent the effects of drug and alcohol misuse on young people. Fred Perry continues to make seasonal donations to the Amy Winehouse Foundation.

Relating to marketing and advertising 

Celebrity branding is crucial in the delivery of a message from the communicators to the audience. These celebrities are often referred to as opinion leaders or OLs. An opinion leader is a well-known individual or group that is used to help influence an opinion on a certain subject or matter due to their perceived social standing. Not to be confused with an opinion former, who is someone who holds professional expertise due to previous study and/or employment and is known to be knowledgeable within the field. These celebrities or OLs will communicate to the audience through socially mediated communications that enable the audience themselves to create a meaning through their own interactions. Examples of outlets include magazines, billboards, television ads, social media promotion and promotional events.

Opinion leaders are the first step in the elements of persuasion. This is most important to the pre-purchase experience when a consumer is most interested in the marketing of the product they are intending to buy. The power of the persuasion that the opinion leader possesses will change depending on many different factors. The first is their credibility, this also works in turn with perceived trustworthiness. Consumers are more likely to believe that the campaign is genuine if the opinion leader is someone who has a reputation for being honest and credible. Another factor is their expertise in that field, although they don't have to be at an opinion former’s  level of expertise, any previous actions, study or jobs that may help the consumer believe that they do know a little bit about what they are promoting, also helps with the authenticity of the advert. For some, the more superficial values hold the most weight in persuasion so the mere fact that the OL is attractive is a key for them, also their social standing not only effects the reach of promotion, but also can attribute to the persuasiveness. People who are the most effected by opinion leaders are those who are often engaged under the peripheral route. The peripheral route is less analytical of the actual product at hand, but will be persuaded due to other factors including an opinion leader that the consumer likes, or attractive elements of the packaging. Whereas those who undertake the central route of persuasion are less affected by these often superficial features and are more likely to choose an option based on the merits of the products or the strength of the argument.

An example of opinion leaders in the social media touch point is the uprising in tourism campaigns running that will fully fund an Instagram opinion leaders travel to their country to 'gram' the whole experience. These opinion leaders are people with a large number of followers (think hundreds of thousands), and a strong influence within a social media community. The photos are of a real experience, so is perceived as very authentic and a real experience. This will be more persuasive in convincing people to travel to the particular country as they want to see the monument, beach, or other landmark that they have seen on social media.

Opinion leaders help businesses overcome a key problem in today's marketing context that is to cut through the clutter. The average consumer 20 years ago was exposed to up to 2,000 adverts a day, while in today's modern marketing platform consumers can be exposed to anywhere up to 5,000 adverts in a 24-hour period. Due to the many different and new advertising outlets used in today's world and the large number of adverts present, one of the biggest struggle for a company is to stand out and differentiate themselves as not all of those 5,000 ads will be memorable, let alone noticeable.

Communication through celebrity branding 
Communication has been variously defined as the passing of information, between a sender and a receiver representing the reasoning behind why celebrity endorsements of brands are so successful in this day and age. This suggests that for communication to occur, there must be some common thinking between two parties and information must be passed from one person to another (or from one group to another).

Media in the past 10 years has changed dramatically. Society as a whole has been completely reconstructed with the advancements in technology. Different models of communication are now used universally – Twitter, Facebook, Instagram etc. – alongside many other traditional media (radio, print and television etc.) Technology through social media now runs the show. As observed technology is rapidly adapting, meaning communication through celebrity branding must also be updated regularly.

Models of communication are always present when marketing a product. Especially when it comes to celebrities endorsing products.

Link with communication 
The link between communication and celebrity branding is that there has to be good communication and understanding between the product/company and the celebrity supporting the good. Therefore, a company can't afford to be shown to the public in a negative connotation due to the celebrity portraying the brand or product incorrectly because of a miscommunication. This creates conflict, frustration or tension (Sabie and Androniceanu, 2012).

The celebrity endorser needs to use persuasive communication to intrigue an audience into the brand's product or service. The celebrity endorser influencing a consumer's intentions, beliefs, attitudes, motivations and behavior in connecting with the brand's product or service can do this. This type of communication can encourage a consumer's decision in purchasing the product/service.

Channel-buzz marketing 
The channel is the method by which the communication travels from the source or sender to the receiver. Buzz marketing comes under the channel method and is another way in which celebrities can create a 'buzz marketing' effect and get people talking about a product. Many marketers are focusing on creating viral buzz to spread the word about their brand by using online techniques. Celebrities best do this as they have wide followings in the 'online world'. Celebrities create a buzz when they promote a new trend or current craze. The public listen, as they can now learn a lot more about celebrities as they follow their daily movements on social media. The public eye can gain an insight into the public figure's attitudes, values and beliefs with a simple click or tap of a screen. The public eye then mimics the actions, preference and lifestyles of their favorite celebrities. This is how the method of 'Buzz Marketing' works so well and is the reasoning behind why big corporations compete against one another to sign contracts with these public figures – they want to create the first 'buzz' in the market. Personally relevant meanings derived from celebrity and brand associations are important as they influence consumer motivation, preference and choice. Creating a buzz is so important from a communicational marketing perspective as it shows how valuable "pass-along" benefits are from consumers talking about a buzz created around a product.

Receiver decoding-decoding

"Decoding is the process of transforming the sender's message back into thought". This explains the reasoning again of why choosing the right celebrity to endorse a product is so crucial. It is important that the company can create the product also in relation to the celebrity as the celebrity is not only a spokesman/ face of the brand but they are also a consumer of the product. "Effective communication is more likely when there is some common ground between the two parties". Because consumers humanize brands  the celebrity must fit with the brand. This highlights the importance of the match up between the celebrity's image and the brand's image.

Example one:
Kim Kardashian promotes a lot of weight loss products as people are interested in how she loses her post-baby weight. Kim Kardashian uses her current situations and then endorses from there. Kim Kardashian and her weight issues are constantly in the media. People are more likely to take notice of what she has to say as they believe that she has personal experience and is knowledgeable about the product and has been selected for that very reason.

Example two:
The All Blacks are a winning side, therefore representing 'Adidas' as a winning product. People young and old follow the All Blacks and are conscious of all things concerned with the All Blacks – they are respected and idolized. The brand's emotional involvement and its relationship with good values, sportsmanship and team morale all contribute to its overall image and success. "When brands establishing a relationship and connection to popular names in entertainment, sports, fashion, and other verticals, there is the potential to boost sales drastically, especially when the consumer believes the product or service is actually used by the celebrity him or herself".  Wearing Adidas is obviously not going to make the consumer have the athletic ability of an All Black but the product is aligned with all the winning attributes of the All Black.

Touchpoints 
Touchpoints are crucial to a brand when it comes to marketing and advertising their product/service. Any point of contact where a business engages with a customer to exchange information about their good/service is considered a touchpoint. It targets the chosen market by taking advantage of the most effective channels to appeal to and entice this group to communicate their intended message. Brands need to think of the most optimal ways to get the word out about their good and the information surrounding it. Different touchpoints allow the brand to appeal to their specific market in the most direct way possible, which considers the particular targeted groups needs and wants out of accessing and receiving information about a product.

In relation to celebrity branding, if a company decides they want to use a famous and well-known celebrity to endorse their campaign, they would need to carefully pick what touchpoints they use to convey their brand to their consumers.

Touchpoints are always evolving as the tastes and preferences of consumers are constantly changing and adapting to the technology and resources that are available. The traditional touchpoints that would have been relevant and effective in the 2000s could be greatly ineffective for marketing ten years later in the 2010s. The same as vital touchpoints marketers use now may have not existed a decade ago like all of the social media websites and apps. Traditional touchpoints began with radio, newspaper and television but now some of the most common touchpoints used in celebrity branding largely are through social media e.g. Facebook, Instagram, Twitter, Tumblr and various other social media webpages. Now with the forever changing technology, people are ditching old touchpoints for newer and faster ones leading sources like newspapers to get printed less and less every year and TV marketing to be less effective as people now can skip past advertisements missing the endorsement and the message it was trying to convey. These new touchpoints are quicker, highly accessible and easy to use for the modern day person with their portable smartphone or computer – this has created celebrity endorsements to be incredibly popular on these sites through the celebrity posting a picture or status advertising the business and their products on their personal accounts. These social media sites give celebrity branding a significant boost and immense opportunities with millions of millions of accounts, creating an audience which is virtually endless.

According to the 'source credibility model', much research and study collated on endorser effectiveness conclude "that a celebrity generally has a greater impact on attitude change and purchase intention than a non-celebrity spokesman". When people view these posts on the celebrity's personal social media account they therefore assume if the spokesman highly regards the good or service, this gains the consumers trust in the business and the purpose it serves.

To keep up with these changes, businesses who strategize using celebrity branding to advertise their campaigns will use the most obvious choice to reach their market. For example, if a brand wants to target the elderly it would make sense to put their celebrity marketing in radio or newspapers – though less used, still used by marketers to appeal to the tradition media users; whereas if they were targeting a younger market who are more social media and technology savvy then they would use websites like Instagram or Facebook to appeal to them and communicate their message.

See also
 Influencer marketing
 Promotional model
 Staunton chess set (1849), possibly the first product marketed through celebrity endorsement
 Testimonial

References

Further reading 
Hamish Pringle (John Wiley & Sons, 8 April 2004) Celebrity Sells, .

Types of branding
Brand management
Celebrity
Marketing techniques
Advertising techniques